Broumov is a town in Náchod District in the Hradec Králové Region of the Czech Republic. It has about 7,100 inhabitants. The town centre is well preserved and is protected by law as an urban monument zone.

Administrative parts

Town parts and villages of Benešov, Kolonie 5. května, Nové Město, Olivětín, Poříčí, Rožmitál and Velká Ves are administrative parts of Broumov.

Etymology
The name is derived from the old personal Czech name Brum (also written as Brúm, Brun, Brún).

Geography
The municipal territory shortly borders Poland in the north. It lies in the Broumov Highlands. The town is situated on the Stěnava River. The territory lies entirely in the Broumovsko Protected Landscape Area.

History

13h–14th centuries
In 1213, King Ottokar I of Bohemia had granted the remote area around today's Broumov and Police nad Metují to the Benedictine monks of Břevnov Monastery in Prague, who began to colonize the lands. The wooden Church of the Virgin Mary already stood here. Broumov was probably founded in 1255. Broumov was first mentioned in 1256 and already referred to as a market village. It was a centre of trade, crafts and administration of the abbatial estates. In 1275, the drapers in Broumov received from King Ottokar II the privilege of producing and selling cloth, and the production soon began to be exported. This laid the foundation for the textile industry in the region.

Many fires broke out and destroyed the original buildings except for the Church of the Virgin Mary and damaged the local castle. In 1305 and following years, the castle was largely rebuilt and extended by one of the abbots into a fortified monastery complex with an abbey and Church of Saint Adalbert. The town became the administrative centre of the abbey's manors. In 1348, it received privileges by King Charles IV similar to royal towns. From 1357 to 1380, the town walls were built.

15th–18th centuriesy
The Broumov Monastery remained strongly tied to Břevnov Monastery, from where the monks fled during the Hussite Wars in 1420 to Broumov. The town was besieged by Hussites, but never conquered. However, it suffered losses and had to invest heavily in strengthening the walls. During the 15th century, Broumov was affected by war conflicts over the Bohemian throne. In the 16th century, the cloth production flourished and until the Thirty Years' War, the town was known as one of the biggest Bohemian producers and exporters of this article. Thanks to the wealth, it was possible to carry out renaissance repairs and build stone houses after the great fire in 1549.

It was incorporated into the Habsburg monarchy in 1526. During the Thirty Years' War, the town was damaged and looted several times. Thanks to good work of abbots between 1663 and 1738, the town recovered and reached economic prosperity. Broumov again suffered in the Silesian Wars from 1740 onwards, when troops of the Prussian Army plundered it and upon the 1742 Treaty of Breslau, the adjacent lands of Silesia and Kłodzko were cut off by the newly established Austro-Prussian border. The wars stopped most of the cloth manufactury.

19th–20th centuries
With Bohemia, the town became part of the Austrian Empire in 1804 and the Cisleithanian (Austrian) side of the Austro-Hungarian monarchy in 1867. From 1868 it was the administrative seat of Braunau District, one of 94 districts in the Austrian Kingdom of Bohemia. After the Austro-Prussian War of 1866, more than 400 citizens emigrated to Latin America, especially to Chile, where the village of Nueva Braunau was established near Puerto Varas in 1875.

During the first half of the 19th century, the built-up area of the town stretched outside the town walls. In the late 19th century, the industrialization started and new factories were established. Textile factories have become the mainstay of the economy.

Upon World War I and the dissolution of Austria-Hungary, Broumov with its predominantly German population became part of the new state of Czechoslovakia according to the 1919 Treaty of Saint-Germain. After the Munich Agreement, Broumov was occupied by Nazi Germany in October 1938 and incorporated into the Regierungsbezirk Aussig of Reichsgau Sudetenland. The Holy See officially separated the Benedictine monasteries of Broumov and Břevnov the next year.

Pursuant to the Beneš decrees, the German-speaking population was expelled, including the monastery's monks, who re-established the Braunau in Rohr Abbey in Bavaria. The Broumov Monastery was finally abolished in 1950; after the Velvet Revolution of 1989, the premises were restored by the country to Břevnov Monastery.

Demographics

Economy
The tradition of the textile industry continues to this day. The main employer in the town is the textile company Veba.

Sights

Broumov has preserved historical centre similar to Silesian towns with a large rectangular market square with two parallel main streets running from both sides of the square and converging at both gates located on the opposite sides of the town. Throughout the perimeter of the old town are preserved fragments of town walls. The town hall on the square was originally from the 13th century and one of the oldest in Bohemia. Its current appearance is a result of many reconstructions, the last are from 1839 and 1994. In the historic centre there are many valuable burghers' houses, originally in the Gothic style and rebuilt in 16th, 18th and 19th centuries.

The Benedictine Monastery of Saint Wenceslaus from the early 14th century was rebuilt in Baroque style to plans by Christoph Dientzenhofer, continued by his son, Kilian Ignaz Dientzenhofer in 1728–1738. Today the monastery houses the regional museum. The monastery garden is also accessible. The monastery Church of Saint Adalbert from 1357 was baroquely rebuilt in 1684–1694.

Besides the monastery church, there are four other significant churches in the town. The rarest is the wooden Church of the Virgin Mary. This cemetery church was founded at the latest in the early 13th century. It was rebuilt in 1450 or 1459 after it was burnt down by the Hussites, and repaired in 1779. It is one of the oldest wooden sacral buildings in central Europe. The church is exceptional not only for its age, but also for its construction technique. It does not contain any nails and is formed by half-timbered structure made of massive oak beams. It includes a gallery with Renaissance and Empire tombstones.

The Church of Saint Peter and Paul was first mentioned in 1258. The church was replaced by a stone building in the 14th century and it rebuilt in Baroque style in 1679–1680. The tower was added in 1682.

The Church of Saint Wenceslaus was built in 1729 from designs made by K. I. Dientzenhofer. The Church of the Holy Spirit was first mentioned in the 14th century. The originally wooden church was replaced in 1689 by the current stone building.

Notable people
Julius Lippert (1839–1909), historian
Alois Jirásek (1851–1930), writer; attended school at Broumov Monastery
Józef Kasparek (1915–2002), historian
Amadeus Webersinke (1920–2005), pianist
Jiří Petr (1931–2014), agroscientist; attended school at Broumov
Peter K. Vogt (born 1932), American molecular biologist and virologist
Christian Feest (born 1945), ethnologist
Pavel Krmaš (born 1980), footballer
Hynek Martinec (born 1980), Czech-British painter
Tomáš Pöpperle (born 1984), ice hockey player

Twin towns – sister cities

Broumov is twinned with:
 Forchheim, Germany (patronage for the town's expellees since 1955)
 Nowa Ruda, Poland

References

External links

Broumov region official tourist portal
Broumov airport

Cities and towns in the Czech Republic
Populated places in Náchod District